Rina Chunga-Kutama is a South African fashion designer and business woman. She is the founder of Rich Factory, a Pan-African fashion brand. She was listed as one of the 2018 Forbes Africa under 30 list.

Early years and education 
Chungu-Kumata was born in Zambia, grew up in Botswana and is now resident in South Africa. She had her training in fashion at London International School of Fashion (LISOF) in Pretoria.

Career 
In 2007, as a means of raising money to support her education, Chungu-Kumata began working on her business while in college, using Zambian prints. She is known to have designed outfits for popular celebrities including Nomzamo Mbatha and Nomuzi Mabena. She has also collaborated with popular brands including Dove, a cosmetic brand and Nestlé. The collection she produced in collaboration with Nestlé was showcased in 2017, during the South African Fashion Week (SAFW).

Personal life 
She is married. She is known to have married her long time beau and now business partner in a heritage themed, Zambia-meets-South-Africa-via-Venda ceremony. The ceremony was dubbed #KutamaFest.

References

Living people
21st-century South African businesswomen
21st-century South African businesspeople
Zambian emigrants to South Africa
Year of birth missing (living people)